Swimming at the 1st Asian Indoor Games was held 13 to 17 November 2005 at the SAT Swimming Pool, Huamark Sports Complex in Bangkok, Thailand. The competition featured 40 short course (25m) events: 20 for males, 20 for females.

Medalists

Men

Women

Medal table

Results

Men

50 m freestyle
13 November

 Vitaliy Khan of Kazakhstan originally won the gold medal, but was disqualified after he tested positive for Cannabinoid.

100 m freestyle
16 November

200 m freestyle
14 November

50 m backstroke
14 November

100 m backstroke
15 November

200 m backstroke
16 November

50 m breaststroke
15 November

100 m breaststroke
13 November

200 m breaststroke
17 November

50 m butterfly
16 November

100 m butterfly
14 November

200 m butterfly
15 November

100 m individual medley
17 November

200 m individual medley
13 November

4 × 25 m freestyle relay
17 November

4 × 50 m freestyle relay
15 November

4 × 100 m freestyle relay
13 November

 Kazakhstan originally won the gold medal, but was disqualified after Vitaliy Khan tested positive for Cannabinoid.

4 × 25 m medley relay
17 November

4 × 50 m medley relay
16 November

4 × 100 m medley relay
14 November

Women

50 m freestyle
13 November

100 m freestyle
16 November

200 m freestyle
14 November

50 m backstroke
14 November

100 m backstroke
15 November

200 m backstroke
16 November

50 m breaststroke
15 November

100 m breaststroke
13 November

200 m breaststroke
17 November

50 m butterfly
16 November

100 m butterfly
14 November

200 m butterfly
15 November

100 m individual medley
17 November

200 m individual medley
13 November

4 × 25 m freestyle relay
17 November

4 × 50 m freestyle relay
15 November

4 × 100 m freestyle relay
13 November

4 × 25 m medley relay
17 November

4 × 50 m medley relay
16 November

4 × 100 m medley relay
14 November

References

 2005 Asian Indoor Games official website

2005 Asian Indoor Games events
Asian Indoor Games
2005